René Antonsen (born 4 March 1992) is a Danish handball player for Aalborg Håndbold and the Danish national team.

He made international debut on the Danish national team on 12 June 2019, against Ukraine.

Achievements 
EHF Champions League:
Runner-up: 2021
Håndboldligaen:
Winner: 2013, 2017, 2019, 2020, 2021
Danish Cup:
Winner: 2019, 2021
Danish Super Cup:
Winner: 2019, 2020, 2021

References

1992 births
Living people
People from Vesthimmerland Municipality
Danish male handball players
Aalborg Håndbold players
Sportspeople from the North Jutland Region